Thomas Bampfield or Bampfylde (c. 1623 – 8 October 1693) was an English lawyer, and Member of Parliament for Exeter between 1654 and 1660. For a short period in 1659, he was Speaker of the House of Commons in the Third Protectorate Parliament.

He served in the 1660 Convention Parliament that agreed The Restoration settlement, but other than a brief period in 1688, retired from active politics in 1661. 

A devout Presbyterian who was later converted to Sabbatarianism by his older brother Francis Bampfield, he published a number of religious works. He died in October 1693.

Personal details
Thomas Bampfield was the eighth son of John Bampfield of Poltimore and his wife Elizabeth, members of the Devon gentry. Like most of their contemporaries, he and his brothers supported Parliament during the 1638 to 1651 Wars of the Three Kingdoms, although there is no record of his military service.

His elder brother Sir John Bampfylde, MP for Penryn until his death in 1650, was one of those excluded by Pride's Purge in December 1648. Another, Francis Bampfield (1615-1683), was a Seventh Day Baptist, who spent nine years in prison for his religious convictions.

Career
Bampfield attended Exeter College, Oxford, followed by legal training at Middle Temple in 1642, although the First English Civil War meant he did not qualify as a lawyer until 1649. In 1654, he was appointed Recorder of Exeter; combined with his Presbyterianism, holding this important legal position led to his election as Member of Parliament for Exeter in the First Protectorate Parliament. It is not clear whether he attended; like many others, he refused to accept Oliver Cromwell's insistence all MPs 'recognise' constitutional limits set out in the Instrument of Government.

In 1656, he was re-elected to the Second Protectorate Parliament, and chaired the Parliamentary committee that tried the Quaker activist James Nayler. He was also a prominent opponent of the 1657 Militia Bill, which sought to enshrine the much hated Rule of the Major Generals. In the Third Protectorate Parliament, he acted as Speaker from 14 April 1659 until it was dissolved on 22 April; he supported the re-seating of MPs excluded in Pride's Purge, and sat in the Convention Parliament that invited Charles II to resume the throne.
 

After The Restoration, he helped draft a petition recommending clemency for the republicans John Lambert and Sir Henry Vane, as well as urging Charles to "marry a Protestant'. His opposition to the restoration of Episcopacy in the Church of England, and support for Puritan regulations prohibiting drunkenness and profanity were out of step with the public mood. He lost his position as Recorder in October 1660, and did not stand again for election as an MP.

His brother Francis, a former Royalist and Prebendary of Exeter Cathedral, rejected his conservative religious beliefs and became an advocate of Sabbatarianism. Bampfield opposed the 1662 Act of Uniformity which evicted priests who refused to subscribe to the Thirty-nine Articles; they included Francis, who spent the next nine years in Dorchester gaol. Thomas was later converted to Sabbatarianism by Francis, who set up a community of Seventh Day Baptists in prison.

Removed as a JP in 1665, Thomas regained some of his former positions in 1688, as the Catholic James II tried to build support among Nonconformists but relinquished them after the 1688 Glorious Revolution. In his last years, he published several works on Sabbatarianism, which elicited responses from mathematician and theologian John Wallis, as well as Baptist minister Isaac Marlow. He died on 8 October 1693, and was buried at St Stephen's Church, Exeter.

Published works

 "An Enquiry Whether the Lord Jesus Christ made the World, and be Jehovah, and gave the Moral Law? And Whether the Fourth Command be Repealed or Altered?"
 "A reply to Doctor Wallis"

References

Sources
 
 
 
 
 
 
 
 

Speakers of the House of Commons of England
Members of the Parliament of England (pre-1707) for Exeter
1623 births
1693 deaths
Alumni of Exeter College, Oxford
17th-century English lawyers
English MPs 1654–1655
English MPs 1656–1658
English MPs 1659
English MPs 1660
English justices of the peace